Susan Civil-Brown is an American author of romance novels with a humorous twist. She is best known under the pseudonym Rachel Lee. Her books include romances, romantic suspense and a series of espionage thrillers (Wildcard, The Crimson Code, The Jerico Pact).

Civil-Brown's first book was published in 1991.  She submitted the manuscript, a romantic suspense novel, at the urging of her mother and was surprised when it was quickly purchased.  Over the next five years she wrote 15 more books.

References

External links
Sue Civil-Brown at fantasticfiction.co.uk
Rachel Lee at fantasticfiction.co.uk

Living people
20th-century American novelists
American romantic fiction writers
American women novelists
Women romantic fiction writers
20th-century American women writers
Year of birth missing (living people)
21st-century American women